The Figueroa River is a river in the Aysén Region of southern Chile in South America. It runs only sixty-one kilometers from Green Lake (Lago Verde) to Rosselot Lake, but is considered an exceptional trout steam for fly fishing, as well as for kayaking and white-water rafting. It is part of the Palena River watershed (catchment basin), and its largest tributary is the Pico River.

The Figueroa River runs through mountainous terrain with often steep sided to sheer banks.  Erosion has increased in the last fifty years as the mountains sides are burned to clear them for pasturage.

Notes and references

Rivers of Chile
Rivers of Aysén Region